Tisovica may refer to:
 Tisovica, Zelenikovo, North Macedonia
 Tisovica (Nova Varoš), Serbia